Douglas George Ross (October 9, 1951 – August 16, 2022) was an American college ice hockey player, 1976 USA Olympic hockey player and college ice hockey head coach. Ross is most noted as head coach of the University of Alabama in Huntsville ice hockey team from 1982–2007 where he won two national club championships and two NCAA Division II championships. Ross also coached the club hockey program at Ohio University and oversaw the transition of Kent State University hockey from club status to varsity status in 1980.

Coaching career
Ross began his college coaching career at Ohio University where he guided the club team for one season. He spent the next two seasons as head coach at Kalamazoo Central High School in Kalamazoo, Michigan. Ross was then hired at Kent State University on July 1, 1979. At Kent, he guided the Golden Flashes from club status to NCAA Division I independent status with a schedule of independent, Division II, Division III, and NAIA varsity teams, as well as select club programs. Unexpectedly, Ross was fired on April 14, 1981. Ross was hired as head coach of Alabama-Huntsville's club ice hockey team on June 8, 1981.

Awards and honors

Player

Coach
 1998 State of Alabama Collegiate Coach of the Year (Sington Award).
 2002–03 College Hockey America Coach of the Year.
 2007 USA Hockey Distinguished Service Award.

Head coaching record

Personal life and death
Ross was the father of former NHL forward Jared Ross. Doug Ross died on August 16, 2022, at the age of 70.

See also
 List of college men's ice hockey coaches with 400 wins

References

External links
 

1951 births
2022 deaths
Alabama–Huntsville Chargers men's ice hockey coaches
American ice hockey coaches
American men's ice hockey right wingers
Bowling Green Falcons men's ice hockey players
Ice hockey players at the 1976 Winter Olympics
Ice hockey coaches from Michigan
Kent State Golden Flashes men's ice hockey coaches
Lake Superior State Lakers men's ice hockey players
Olympic ice hockey players of the United States
Sportspeople from Dearborn, Michigan
Ice hockey people from Alabama
Ice hockey people from Detroit